Trichrous prasinus is a species of beetle in the family Cerambycidae. It was described by Cazier and Lacey in 1952.

References

Heteropsini
Beetles described in 1952